The Men's Long Jump athletics events for the 2016 Summer Paralympics take place at the Rio Olympic Stadium from September 8. A total of 9 events are contested for 9 different classifications.

Men's Long Jump Results

T11

The T11 event took place on 8 September.

T12

The T12 event took place on 10 September.

T20

The T20 event took place on 11 September.

T36
The T36 event took place on 12 September.

T37
The T37 event took place on 13 September.

T38
The T38 event took place on 15 September.

T42
The T42 event took place on 17 September.

T44
The T44 event took place on 17 September. The event incorporates athletes from classification  T43 in addition to T44

T47
The T47 event took place on 14 September. The event incorporates athletes from classifications T45 and  T46  in addition to T47

References

Athletics at the 2016 Summer Paralympics
2016 in men's athletics